Infinite Dreams Inc.  or Infinite Dreams is a game development studio in Gliwice, Poland. Founded in 2002, the company develops games for a range of digital platforms such as iOS, Android, macOS, Windows Phone and Symbian. The studio is best known for its Sky Force series. Games developed by Infinite Dreams have been downloaded over 25,000,000 times worldwide.

Games developed

Sky Force series 

 Sky Force – Symbian, Pocket PC (2004), Palm webOS (2005)
 Sky Force Reloaded – Symbian, Pocket PC, Palm webOS (2006), iOS (2009), Android (2010), PSP (2011)(Note: the PSP version of Sky Force Reloaded is simply titled Sky Force.)
 Sky Force 2014 - iOS, Android (2014)(Note: the PC and console version is titled Sky Force Anniversary.)
 Sky Force Anniversary - PlayStation 4 (September 7, 2016), Windows/macOS (April 30, 2015), Xbox One (December 12, 2016), Nintendo Switch (November 8, 2018)
 Sky Force Reloaded(2016) - iOS (May 1, 2016), Android (May 2, 2016), PlayStation 4 (November 28, 2017), Windows/macOS (November 30, 2017), Xbox One (December 1, 2017), Nintendo Switch (February 1, 2018)

Other games 
 Crazy Dino Park – Android, iOS (2018)
 Shoot The Zombirds – iOS, Android (2012)
 Jelly Defense – iOS, Android, Mac OS X (2011)
 Jelly Band – iOS, Android (2011)
 Shoot The Birds – iOS, Android (2011)
 Can Knockdown 3 - iOS, Android (2013)
 Can Knockdown 2 – iOS, Android (2011)
 Can Knockdown – iOS (2010), Android (2011)
 Let's Create! Pottery – iOS (2010), Mac OS X, Android, Symbian, Nintendo DSiWare (2011), Nintendo WiiWare (2012)
 Sailboat Championship PRO – iOS (2010), Mac OS X (2011)
 Big Roll in Paradise – Symbian, Nokia N-Gage (2010)
 iQuarium – iOS (2009), Android (2010)
 Hooked On: Creatures of the Deep – N-Gage 2.0 (2008)
 K-Rally – Symbian (2006)
 Super Miners – Symbian, Pocket PC (2005), Palm webOS, Windows (2006)
 Explode Arena – Symbian (2004)
 Micromachines – Game Boy Advance (2003)

Awards
 Jelly Defense – Best of Mac App Store 2011
 GameDynamo: Best Mobile Game 2011 [Jelly Defense]
 Meffys 2008 Award [Hooked on: Creatures of the Deep]
 IGN Best of 2011 Nominee / Best Mobile Strategy Game
 Review on the Run: Best iOS Strategy Game of the Year

References

External links
 

Video game companies of Poland
Video game development companies
Video game companies established in 2002
Polish companies established in 2002
Gliwice